Teodoro Nölting (born 15 October 1917 – 30 April 1976) was an Argentine rower. He competed in the men's double sculls event at the 1948 Summer Olympics.

References

External links
 

1917 births
1976 deaths
Argentine male rowers
Olympic rowers of Argentina
Rowers at the 1948 Summer Olympics
Rowers from Buenos Aires